Auliscomys is a genus of rodent in the family Cricetidae. It contains the following species:
 Bolivian big-eared mouse (Auliscomys boliviensis)
 Painted big-eared mouse (Auliscomys pictus)
 Andean big-eared mouse (Auliscomys sublimis)

References

 
Rodent genera
Taxa named by Oldfield Thomas
Taxonomy articles created by Polbot